Allan John Elliot (1 February 1906 − 5 January 1973), sometimes Elliott, was a New Zealand athlete, who represented his country in the sprint events at the 1930 British Empire Games in Hamilton, Ontario, and the 1932 Olympic Games in Los Angeles.

Early life and family
Born in Thames on 1 February 1906, Elliot was the son of Matthew Halliday Elliot and Edith Amy Elliot (née Cryer). On 8 June 1933 he married Eunice Elva Edwina Macdonald, but they later separated, and Eunice Elliot died in 1958. Elliot's second wife was Barbara Ann Elliot.

Athletics
Regarded as a "brilliant sprinter" who was "heavily muscled", Elliot won four New Zealand national athletics titles: the 100 yards in 1929, 1930, and 1932; and the 220 yards in 1929 and 1932. Elliot 's best time of 9.8 second for 100 yards stood as the New Zealand record for over 20 years.

At the 1930 British Empire Games, Elliot did not progress beyond the heats of the 100 yards and 220 yards. However, at the 1932 Olympics he reached the semi-finals of both the 100 m and 200 m events.

Elliot later continued his involvement in athletics as an administrator, and served as president of the Waitakere Golf Club for five years.

Later life and death
Elliot spent most of his working life as a grocer, and was a relieving manager at various shops in Auckland during his last five years. He died on 5 January 1973, and his body was cremated at Waikumete.

Legacy
Elliot modelled for the sculpture of an athlete by Richard Oliver Gross at the Auckland Domain gates.

Competition record

References

1906 births
1973 deaths
Sportspeople from Thames, New Zealand
New Zealand male sprinters
Commonwealth Games competitors for New Zealand
Athletes (track and field) at the 1930 British Empire Games
Olympic athletes of New Zealand
Athletes (track and field) at the 1932 Summer Olympics
New Zealand sports executives and administrators